Bombhaat is a 2020 Indian Telugu-language science fiction film directed by Raghavendra Varma and produced by Vishwas Hannurkar under the Sucheta DreamWorks Productions banner. The film is presented by K. Raghavendra Rao and the music is scored by Josh B. The film stars Sai Sushanth Reddy, Chandini Chowdary, and Simran Choudhary.

Plot 
With luck never on his side, a young robotics engineer constantly battles his comedic misfortune. But things take a serious turn once he becomes entangled in an epic revenge story between his God Father and the Mad Scientist, who is chasing a dangerously powerful formula. A tale of twisted love, with sparks of Sci-Fi, and a deadly plot of vengeance. Will the power of science finally triumph over fate?

Cast 
 Sai Sushanth as Vicky
 Chandini Chowdary as Chaitra
 Simran Choudary as Maya
 Priyadarshi Pulikonda as Karun
 Shishir Sharma as Professor Aacharya, Maya's father 
 Makarand Deshpande as Mad Scientist 
 Vineet Kumar as Dada
 Tanikella Bharani as Varaha Murthy, Vicky's father
 Hema as Kumari, Vicky's mother
 Fish Venkat as Dada's henchman
 Pramodini as Maya's mother
 Dhanvi as young Maya
 Silly Monks Sanjay as Chaitra's father
 Rama Devi as Chaitra's grandmother

Soundtrack 
The soundtrack and background score was scored by Josh B, and the audio was released on Lahari Music.

Reception 
The film received negative reviews from critics.The News Minute, rated the film 2/5 and stated that "Bombhaat suffers from clichéd, occasionally cringeworthy writing, that also trickles into the performances." Manoj Kumar of The Indian Express rated the film 1 star out of 5, and wrote "A sci-fi film that neither serves drama nor logic." Kumar opined that the director uses Hitchcock's quote "Where drama begins logic ends" as an excuse "to make an utterly nonsensical movie that neither serves drama nor logic."

The Hindu's Sangeetha Devi wrote about the film that "This isn’t science, just dull and drab fiction."

References

External links
 

2020 films
2020 drama films
2020 science fiction films
Indian science fiction films
2020s Telugu-language films
Amazon Prime Video original films